Laura Lapi (born 10 September 1970) is a former professional tennis player from Italy.

Biography
As a junior, Lapi was runner-up to Natalia Zvereva in the 1987 Orange Bowl and was also a girls' doubles finalist at the 1988 US Open.

Lapi was a member of the Italy Fed Cup team in the 1988 competition. She won her first match, over Poland's Magdalena Feistel, to help Italy win the tie. In the second round, the Italians were beaten by home side Australia and Lapi lost her match in three sets to Nicole Provis.

Her best performance on the WTA Tour was a semifinal appearance at Paris in 1988. She had a win over Jana Novotná at the 1988 German Open. In 1990, she received her best ranking of 66 in the world, after making the third round at Hilton Head, in a run which included beating Claudia Kohde-Kilsch.

Lapi made the third round of the 1990 French Open. At the Wimbledon Championships that followed, her first-round opponent was Hana Mandliková, who had announced she would retire at the end of the tournament. She lost to Mandliková 9–11 in the third set, having been unable to convert three match points.

ITF finals

Singles (6–6)

Doubles (1–2)

References

External links
 
 
 

1970 births
Living people
Italian female tennis players
20th-century Italian women